Spreewald was a German passenger-carrying freighter built in 1922 by Deutsche Werft at Hamburg for the Hamburg America Line. The ship was renamed Anubis in 1935, but reverted to Spreewald in 1939.

Service history
Spreewald ran aground at Emden, Lower Saxony, Germany, on 28 April 1924. She was refloated the next day.

At the outbreak of World War II, the ship was interned at Port Arthur, China. In 1941 she was brought back into service and sailed on 21 October 1941, loaded with 3,365 tons of rubber, 230 tons of tin and 20 tons of tungsten, and quinine. While en route to Germany she rendezvoused with the German supply ship Kulmerland and embarked 86 British prisoners, survivors of ships sunk by the auxiliary cruiser Kormoran.

On 31 January 1942 Spreewald was on her approach to Bordeaux in France when she was torpedoed by U-333, whose commander, Kapitänleutnant Peter-Erich Cremer, believed her to be a British ship. U-333 fired two torpedoes, which hit Spreewald amidships, causing her to burn furiously and slowly sink in position 

U-105 picked up 25 crewmen and 55 prisoners in lifeboats and rafts. Of the 152 aboard the Spreewald, 72 were killed.

Cremer was subsequently court-martialled, but found not guilty.

References
Notes

Bibliography
 Spreewald - Ships hit by U-boats - uboat.net
 More Maritime Disasters of WWII 1942

1922 ships
Ships of the Hamburg America Line
Merchant ships of Germany
World War II merchant ships of Germany
Ships sunk by German submarines in World War II
World War II shipwrecks in the Atlantic Ocean
Maritime incidents in 1924
Maritime incidents in January 1942
Friendly fire incidents of World War II